In the 1938 FIFA World Cup qualification Group 7, the two teams played against each other on a home-and-away basis. The winner would qualify for the third FIFA World Cup held in France.

Matches

Bulgaria vs Czechoslovakia

Czechoslovakia vs Bulgaria

NOTE: Ľudovít Rado missed a penalty.

Team stats

Head coach:  Josef Tesař (first match),  Václav Meissner (second match)

Head coach:  Stanislav Toms

References

External links
FIFA official page
RSSSF - 1938 World Cup Qualification
Allworldcup

7
1937–38 in Bulgarian football
Qual